Tilmacoxib or JTE-522 is a COX-2 inhibitor and is an effective chemopreventive agent against rat experimental liver fibrosis.

See also 
 NS-398
 Celecoxib

References 

COX-2 inhibitors
Oxazoles